Dilophodelphis is an extinct genus of river dolphin from Early Miocene (Burdigalian) marine deposits in Oregon. The type species, Dilophodelphis fordycei, was named in 2017.

Biology and description
Dilophodelphis is distinguished from other extinct relatives of the South Asian river dolphin in having enlarged supraorbital crests resembling a twin mountain arrangement, quite similar to the crests of the theropod dinosaur Dilophosaurus.

References

River dolphins
Miocene cetaceans
Fossil taxa described in 2017

Cetacean genera